North West Cambridgeshire is a county constituency represented in the House of Commons of the Parliament of the United Kingdom. It elects one Member of Parliament (MP) by the first past the post system of election.

Constituency profile 

This safe Conservative Party seat includes a substantial part of the cathedral city of Peterborough, specifically the suburban areas to the south of the river Nene and west of the Soke Parkway, as well as several rural wards from the historic county of Huntingdonshire. While both Labour and the Liberal Democrats are competitive in some wards at local elections, the opposition is evenly divided, and there is a strong Conservative presence in all parts of the seat, ensuring a large majority for the Conservatives.

The London Road home of Peterborough United F.C. is located within the seat.

The seat was won upon its creation in 1997 by Sir Brian Mawhinney, former Conservative MP for Peterborough (which was gained at the same election by the Labour Party). He retired from the House of Commons in 2005 and was created Baron Mawhinney, of Peterborough in the county of Cambridgeshire. The Conservative Shailesh Vara has represented the constituency since the 2005 general election.

Boundaries and boundary changes 

1997–2010:  The District of Huntingdonshire wards of Bury, Earith, Elton, Farcet, Ramsey, Sawtry, Somersham, Stilton, Upwood and the Raveleys, Warboys, and Yaxley, and the City of Peterborough wards of Barnack, Fletton, Glinton, Northborough, Orton Longueville, Orton Waterville, Stanground, and Wittering.

2010–present:  The District of Huntingdonshire wards of Earith, Ellington, Elton and Folksworth, Ramsey, Sawtry, Somersham, Stilton, Upwood and the Raveleys, Warboys and Bury, and Yaxley and Farcet, and the City of Peterborough wards of Barnack, Fletton, Glinton and Wittering, Northborough, Orton Longueville, Orton Waterville, Orton with Hampton, Stanground Central, and Stanground East.

The constituency was formed for the 1997 general election from northern, rural parts of the county constituency of Huntingdon, including Ramsey, and parts of the Borough Constituency of Peterborough, comprising residential areas to the south of the River Nene (wards of Fletton, Orton Longueville, Orton Waterville and Stanground).  Following their review of parliamentary representation in Cambridgeshire in 2005, the Boundary Commission for England made minor alterations to the existing constituencies to deal with population changes, including a small further gain from Huntingdon. There were also marginal changes to take account of the redistribution of City of Peterborough wards. These changes increased the electorate from 69,082 to 73,648. On the enumeration date of 17 February 2000, the electoral quota for England was 69,934 voters per constituency.

Withdrawn Candidates in 2019 

Liam Round was selected to be the Brexit Party candidate, but he withdrew on 10 November.  Peterborough City Councillor Ed Murphy was chosen as the Labour Party candidate, but was deselected by the party on 14 November after it was alleged, but not proven, that he had published tweets vilifying Israel.

Members of Parliament

Elections

Elections in the 2010s

Elections in the 2000s

Elections in the 1990s

See also 
List of parliamentary constituencies in Cambridgeshire
Peterborough
Huntingdon

References

External links
United Kingdom Parliament
Boundary Commission for England

Parliamentary constituencies in Cambridgeshire
Constituencies of the Parliament of the United Kingdom established in 1997
Politics of Peterborough
Politics of Huntingdonshire